James Edward Oglethorpe (22 December 1696 – 30 June 1785) was a British soldier, Member of Parliament, and philanthropist, as well as the founder of the colony of Georgia in what was then British America. As a social reformer, he hoped to resettle Britain's "worthy poor" in the New World, initially focusing on those in debtors' prisons.

Born to a prominent British family, Oglethorpe left college in England and a British Army commission to travel to France, where he attended a military academy before fighting under Prince Eugene of Savoy in the Austro-Turkish War. He returned to England in 1718, and was elected to the House of Commons in 1722. His early years were relatively undistinguished until 1729, when Oglethorpe was made chair of the Gaols Committee that investigated British debtors' prisons. After the report was published, to widespread attention, Oglethorpe and others began publicizing the idea of a new colony, to serve as a buffer between the Carolinas and Spanish Florida. After being granted a charter, Oglethorpe sailed to Georgia in November 1732.

He was a major figure in the early history of the colony, holding much civil and military power and instituting a ban on slavery and alcohol. During the War of Jenkins' Ear,  Oglethorpe led British troops in Georgia against Spanish forces based in Florida. In 1740, he led a lengthy Siege of St. Augustine, which was unsuccessful. He then defeated a Spanish Invasion of Georgia in 1742. Oglethorpe left the colony after another unsuccessful invasion of St. Augustine, and never returned. He led some government troops in the Jacobite rising of 1745 and was blamed for British defeat in the Clifton Moor Skirmish. Despite being cleared in a court martial, Oglethorpe never held British command again. He lost reelection to the House of Commons in 1754. He left England and served undercover in the Prussian Army during the Seven Years' War. In his later years, Oglethorpe was prominent in literary circles, becoming close to James Boswell and Samuel Johnson.

Early life and family
His family history dates back to William the Conqueror. They supported Charles I, an unpopular monarch. They suffered under Oliver Cromwell, but regained favor following the Stuart Restoration in 1660. Theophilus Oglethorpe, the head of the family, lived next to the royal palace at Whitehall; he and his brothers were members of Parliament. At Whitehall Theophilus met Eleanor Wall, one of Queen Anne's ladies-in-waiting, and the two fell in love and married in 1680. They had ten children: Lewis, Anne, Eleanor, Theophilus Jr., James, Frances Charlotte, Sutton, Louise Mary, and James Edward. James Edward was the Oglethorpes’ youngest child and their fifth son. He was born on 22 December 1696. Little is known about Oglethorpe's early life. He was named James after James II, reflecting his family's royalist sympathies, and Edward after James Francis Edward Stuart. Oglethorpe was baptized on 23 December at St Martin-in-the-Fields in London.

Early military career
Oglethorpe's father bought him a commission in Queen Anne's 1st regiment of Foot Guards as an ensign in 1707, he was commissioned to be lieutenant unassigned on 21 November 1713 with the rank of captain of foot (infantry). Following in the footsteps of his older brothers, he entered Eton College. His mother managed to have him enter Corpus Christi College, Oxford, where he matriculated on 8 July 1714 with Basil Kennett as his tutor. His army commission was renewed in 1715 by George I, but he resigned on 23 November 1715, in part because the Foot Guards were not expected to see action.

Oglethorpe then traveled to France, where both his sisters Anne and Fanny lived, he attended the military academy at Lompres, near Paris, where he met and befriended fellow-student James Francis Edward Keith. The following year, intending to fight in the Austro-Turkish War, he travelled to serve under military commander Prince Eugene of Savoy. With a letter of recommendation from the Duke of Argyle and several other prominent Britons, Oglethorpe and Louis François Crozat arrived and with Infante Manuel, Count of Ourém entered the Prince's service on 3 August as an aides-de-camp. Oglethorpe was present but not actively engaged in the Battle of Petrovaradin in August 1716. At the Siege of Timisoara in September that same year he served as aide-de-camp. He found active command at the Siege of Belgrade from 19 June to 16 August. After the death of his superior in combat, on 16 August, Oglethorpe as the most senior aide-de-camp acted ad adjutant general; as such he took possession of the Turkish camp, and reported to the Prince the casualty report. After the battle, he was offered the rank of lieutenant colonel in the army— which he never accepted.

Oglethorpe then fought in Sicily under General Georg Olivier Wallis in 1718 for several weeks. By 19 September, he had returned to England. Despite his hope otherwise, Oglethorpe was refused a commission in the British Army and was briefly back at Corpus Christi beginning on 25 June 1719.

As a Member of Parliament 
When he was twenty-six, Oglethorpe inherited the family estate at Godalming in Surrey from his brother. He was first elected to the House of Commons as a Tory aligned with William Wyndham in 1722, representing Haslemere. Oglethorpe remained unchallenged until 1734. He almost did not serve when, in a drunken brawl, he killed a man and spent five months in prison, before he was cleared of murder through the influence of a powerful friend and released from prison. He took his seat in the House of Commons on 9 October.

Oglethorpe was, according to Pitofsky, "among the least productive representatives," who notes that in the six years after he was first elected, he was actively involved in only two debates. In contrast, Sweet writes that Oglethorpe was an "eloquent yet honest" speaker who had strong Tory principals and genuinely cared about the conditions of his constituents, citing that his service on forty different committees that investigated widely varied topics. His first participation in debate was on 6 April 1723, unsuccessfully opposing the banishment of the bishop Francis Atterbury, who had been accused of supporting James Francis Edward Stuart.

In response to the poor living and working conditions of sailors in the Royal Navy, Oglethorpe published an anonymous pamphlet titled "The Sailors Advocate" in 1728 about press gangs and pay issues. It was 52 pages long and argued for reforming and strengthening the Navy and against impressment. However, he proposed few real solutions apart from analysing the work of navies of other countries. Sweet considers that it marks the beginning of Oglethorpe's philanthropy and writes that it "gave Oglethorpe the practical experience necessary to undertake future efforts more successfully". The pamphlet was reprinted several times throughout the 18th century.

Gaols Committee

In the late 1720s, Oglethorpe's attentions were drawn to the conditions of debtors' prisons after his friend, Robert Castell, was sent to Fleet Prison and eventually died. Oglethorpe motioned to investigate the warden of the prison, and was made chairman of the resulting committee on 25 February 1729. As chair of the Gaols Committee, he began touring debtors' prisons in late February and the following month finished the first of three detailed reports presented to parliament. In the reports various abuses in the prisons were profiled, including torturing, overcrowding, and widespread disease. The reports particularly attacked Thomas Bambridge, the warden of Fleet Prison, where Castell had died. He urged for reform of the prisons, mainly through prosecution of those in charge of them. Most of the blame was laid on the individual prison wardens, rather than the system as a whole. While these reports attracted much attention, there was little real change. The investigation ended on 14 May.

In the aftermath (the final report was presented on 8 May 1730), Oglethorpe and the committee were praised by prominent Britons such as Alexander Pope, James Thomson, Samuel Wesley, and William Hogarth. Pitofsky writes that there was seemingly a "great deal of popular support for the committee". However, Conservative members of the House of Commons attempted to prevent much change through deriding members of the committee as "amateurs and zealots" and preventing the wardens from being jailed. On 3 April 1730, a bill drafted by Oglethorpe was presented to the House; it would have removed Bambridge from his position. It was adopted in a revised form six weeks later by both Houses. However, recommendations for a bill to better oversee Fleet Prison were discarded. In the Trial of William Acton for murdering four debtors, Acton was acquitted. Oglethorpe felt that the proceedings had been manipulated. Bambridge was acquitted of charges as well. Oglethorpe denounced both acquittals. Shortly afterwards, Oglethorpe disbanded the committee. He led another committee of the same nature in 1754.

Other stances and later service 
Oglethorpe, a committed advocate against alcohol, proposed a tax on malt in the same session the Gaols Committee was authorized. He argued against a royal grant of 115,000 pounds to cover arrearages, considering it extravagant. Oglethorpe also initially opposed Britain being involved in making peace in Europe, but by 1730 had begun advocating military preparedness. Oglethorpe served on a committee investigating the Charitable Corporation after its 1731 collapse. In the 1732 Parliamentary session, he staunchly opposed the administration's policy of disarmament and continued to emphasize the need for preparedness. Although Oglethorpe held his seat until 1754, after he left for Georgia he was rarely involved in parliamentary affairs, and after Robert Walpole lost his power in 1742 Oglethorpe lost most of his remaining influence and primarily held office in opposition to those who held power.

Establishment of Georgia 

While working on the Gaols Committee, Oglethorpe met and became close to John Perceval (who later became the first Earl of Egmont). After leaving the committee, Oglethorpe considered sending around a hundred unemployed people from London to America. In 1730, Oglethorpe shared a plan to establish a new American colony with Perceval. The colony would be a place to send "the unemployed and the unemployable", and he anticipated broad societal support.  He was soon granted 5,000 pounds for the colony by the trustees of the estate of a man named King. Oglethorpe began looking for other sources of funding and met Thomas Bray, a reverend and philanthropist. Bray, in failing health by 1730, had founded the Bray Associates to continue his humanitarian work. Perceval was a trustee of the associates, and Oglethorpe was made a trustee in February 1730, the same month that Bray died. Although initially there was no set location for the colony, Oglethorpe settled on America on 1 April. It soon became clear that a colony south of the Savannah River would be supported by the House of Commons, as it could serve as a 'buffer' between the prosperous Carolinas and Spanish Florida, and Oglethorpe picked the region on 26 June. People sent to the colony would serve as both soldiers and farmers, making the colony "South Carolina's first line of defence". In July, they started campaigns to raise money through subscription and grants.

The Bray Associates determined to put "all available funds" towards the colony on 1 July, and they presented a charter to the Privy Council of the United Kingdom on 17 September. On 12 November, the Bray Associates announced a plan to increase support for their proposed colony through a promotional campaign, which mainly consisted of producing promotional literature. Baine writes that beginning in 1730, Oglethorpe "directed the promotional campaign and wrote, or edited, almost all of the promotional literature until he sailed for Georgia". The first written work about the proposal was by Oglethorpe and titled Some accounts of the design of the trustees for establishing colonys in America. Though it was finished in spring 1731 and never published, Benjamin Martyn drew on it when writing his 1732 book Some Account of the Designs of the Trustees for Establishing the Colony of Georgia in America.

Oglethorpe arranged for Martyn's work to be widely read; in addition to being independently published, it appeared in The London Journal, the Country Journal, the Gentlemen's Magazine, and the South Carolina Gazette. Various notices seeking donations and people willing to emigrate to the colony were published in other English newspapers. In November 1732, Oglethorpe had Select Tracts Relating to Colonies published. In 1733, Reasons for Establishing the Colony of Georgia in America, written by Martyn, and A New and Accurate Account of the Provinces of South-Carolina and Georgia, by Oglethorpe, were published. Oglethorpe is thought to have paid for the publication of Select Tracts and A New and Accurate Account. In 1732, Oglethorpe advocated for extending Thomas Lombe's patent on a silk engine.

In June 1732, Oglethorpe, Perceval, Martyn, and a group of other prominent Britons (collectively known as the Trustees for the Establishment of the Colony of Georgia in America) petitioned for and were eventually granted a royal charter to establish the colony of Georgia between the Savannah River and the Altamaha River on 9 June 1732. The following month they selected the first group to send to the colony from wide-ranging applications. Oglethorpe's mother had died on 19 June, and he decided to join the group and travel to Georgia. He was formally placed in charge of publicizing the Georgia colony on 3 August.  

That summer, a letter written by Ayuba Suleiman Diallo, an enslaved merchant, reached Oglethorpe. He purchased and freed Diallo. Oglethorpe, who had been made a director or assistant of the Royal African Company in January 1731 and elected a deputy governor in 1732, sold his stock and resigned after the 'Diallo incident' and shortly before leaving for Georgia. Oglethorpe set sail from Gravesend for Georgia with 114 others on the Anne on 15 or 17 November 1732.

In Georgia 
The Anne reached Charleston, South Carolina, on 13 January 1733. When they arrived in Georgia 1 February 1733, Spalding notes that Oglethorpe chose to settle "as far from the Spanish as he geographically could". As Spain disliked their presence in the region, Oglethorpe was careful to maintain good relations with the Native Americans who lived in the region. Left for England and expanded Georgia further south when he returned. When Oglethorpe returned to England in 1737 he was confronted by an angry British and Spanish government. That year, Oglethorpe granted land to 40 Jewish settlers against the orders of the Georgia trustees.

On 4 December 1731, Oglethorpe entered into a partnership with Jean-Pierre Pury to settle land in South Carolina. He gained a 1/4 stake in a  plot of land. His holdings, termed the 'Oglethorpe Barony' were located at the 'Palachocolas', a crossing of the Savannah River in Granville County. From 1732 to 1738, Oglethorpe was the de facto leader of Georgia and dominated both the military and the civil aspects of the country. From 1738 to 1743 he commanded a British regiment and was also involved in civil affairs before returning to England. While he was involved with the colony, Oglethorpe was the most prominent trustee and the only one to actually live in the colony. He was also involved in mapping the colony.

Oglethorpe founded the still-active Solomon's Masonic Lodge in 1734.

Early influence 

Oglethorpe and the trustees formulated a contractual, multi-tiered plan for the settlement of Georgia (see the Oglethorpe Plan). The plan envisioned a system of "agrarian equality", designed to support and perpetuate an economy based on family farming, and prevent social disintegration associated with unregulated urbanisation. Self-supporting colonists were able to obtain larger grants, but such grants were structured in  increments tied to the number of indentured servants supported by the grantee. Servants would receive a land grant of their own upon completing their term of service. No-one was permitted to acquire additional land through purchase or inheritance.

Despite arriving in Georgia with relatively limited power, Oglethorpe soon became the main authority in the colony. Lannen writes that he "became everything to everyone". He negotiated with the Yamacraw Indiansbecoming the colony's ambassador to native tribescommanded the militia, directed the building of Savannah and otherwise generally supervised the colony. In early 1733, "every matter of importance was brought first to Oglethorpe". He lived in a tent separated from the rest of the colonists; some of them called him "father". Oglethorpe paid for the construction of a 'first fort' to protect Savannah, but it was not completed. He invited talented foreigners to immigrate to the colony. In June 1733, Oglethorpe traveled to Charleston. In his absence, the citizens of Savannah had a disagreement over the authority of the man left in charge. They waited for Oglethorpe to return and resolve it. It was not until July that a separate court was established, but Oglethorpe continued to hold much civil power.

When Oglethorpe arrived in Georgia, Native Americans were well into the process of integration with the Europeans. He saw Native Americans as participants in the new economy Europeans brought to America. Weaver notes that he was known for "fair dealing with the Indians". He negotiated with Tomochichi, chief of the Yamacraw tribe for land to build Savannah on. Tomochichi became Oglethope's "strongest ally in the New World."

As there were rumors a war with France might break out in early 1734, Oglethorpe traveled to Charleston, arriving on 2 March. While there he discussed Indian affairs and, after conferencing with the leadership of the Carolinas, decided to raise a company to build "a fort among the Upper Creek" that would counter French influence in the area and serve as a safe house for traders should a war break out between native tribes. Oglethorpe commissioned Patrick Mackay a captain and delegated the task to him. On 7 May Oglethorpe departed for Britain aboard , taking with him a delegation of Creek Indians, including Tomochichi, who was invited by the Georgia trustees to be present during the formal ratification of Oglethorpe's treaty with the Yamacraw.

The delegation arrived on 16 June, and met George II and his family at Kensington Palace. Oglethorpe was widely acclaimed in London, although his expansionism was not welcomed in all quarters. The Duke of Newcastle, who directed British foreign policy, had tried to restrain James Oglethorpe's efforts in the colony for fear of offending the Spanish, whom Newcastle wished unsuccessfully to court as an ally. Newcastle eventually relented, and became a supporter of the colony, admitting "it will now be pretty difficult to give up Georgia". The colony's existence was one of several disputes which worsened Anglo-Spanish relations in the late 1730s. When Tomochichi returned to England, he said that parting with Oglethorpe was "like the day of death". In March 1735 the trustees requested 51,800 pounds from parliament, upon the urging of Oglethorpe, in part to construct forts along the Altamaha River. 26,000 pounds were eventually budgeted and the trustees approved construction of two forts on the river.

Oglethorpe's return to England reinvigorated interest in meetings of Georgia's trustees. At his urging the trustees banned the sale of rum, slavery, and regulated negotiations with Native Americans. He was placed in charge of granting licenses to trade with Native Americans, a power that he used often, only granting the right to Georgians and causing Carolinian resentment. When Oglethorpe returned to England in 1734, he had left an authority vacuum behind. There was disagreement between the civil and military authorities while he was away; a reported insurrection played a role in his decision to return. In December 1735 he left for Georgia with 257 further immigrants to the colony, arriving in February 1736.

For the nine months that he remained in the colony, Oglethorpe was mainly at Frederica, a town he laid out to function as a bulwark against Spanish interference, where he again held the most authority. He drilled soldiers and oversaw the construction of a fort. In May he traveled to Savannah and heard 300–400 complaints, serving as "supreme civil authority". Increasingly, however, Oglethorpe focused on Georgia's southern border and military matters. He remained confident in the belief that he was "best suited to govern". Oglethorpe also held a conference with the Natives as commissioner for Indian Affairs in 1736. Complaints about Oglethorpe's actions came from Spain, Carolina, the trustees, and discontented citizens. Oglethorpe left the colony in November to request a military regiment, leaving behind another power vacuum. Discontent increased, which Oglethorpe considered a symptom of his absence. In England, he convinced the trustees of his "impeccable conduct" and was thanked for his service.

War of Jenkins' Ear 

When Oglethorpe left England the first time, Robert Walpole had ordered him to avoid intentional conflict with Spain. However, given the intended function of Georgia as a 'buffer', Oglethorpe considered conflict with Spain to be inevitable. When Oglethorpe returned to lobby for military aid in 1737, he began by requesting a grant of 30,000 pounds from parliament in January. He also requested unsuccessfully to be allowed to raise a militia, but was granted 20,000 pounds and made General of the Forces of South Carolina and Georgia. He was offered, but declined governorship of South Carolina. In 1737 Thomas Pelham-Holles granted him permission to raise the forty-second regiment for defense of Georgia's border with Spanish Florida.

He was promoted to the rank of colonel on 10 September 1737. The following year, 246 soldiers of the 25th Regiment of Foot were incorporated into the regiment. After three further companies were recruited in England, the regiment was stationed at Fort Frederica. A Spanish invasion of the colony was planned in March 1738, but cancelled. In response to Oglethorpe gaining formal control of a regiment, other trustees—mainly Edward Vernon—became more vocal in insisting that Oglethorpe stay out of the colony's civil affairs. They also accused him of being an opportunist by starting to vote with Robert Walpole and felt Oglethorpe did not adequately keep the trustees informed of affairs in the colonies. Before allowing Oglethorpe to return to Georgia, they had "laboured to abridge his power". In October or September 1738 he returned to Frederica and soon had re-assumed his role as de facto leader of the colony.

Oglethorpe began to prepare for a war after as early as 1738, raising additional troops and rented or purchased several boats after the Royal Navy refused to station a ship there. Oglethorpe spent his whole fortune, £103,395, on building up Georgia's defenses. He  allowed a pirate to attack Spanish shipping and worked to secure the support of the Native Americans in the area by meeting with them. He soon became very sick, and remained in poor health for the duration of the campaign. While Oglethorpe was preparing for war, he also worked to combine civil and military authority. He increasingly ignored the wishes of the other trustees, for instance not passing on a change in the land policy when he felt that the colonists would object to it. The War of Jenkins' Ear broke out in 1739.

After receiving a letter from King George II on 7 September 1739, Oglethorpe began encouraging the Creek Indians to attack Spanish Florida. A mutiny by troops from Europe was quickly quelled. In response to a Spanish attack in November, he led 200 men in a raid on Florida, on 1 December. They penetrated as far as Fort Picolata, but retreated when it became clear they had insufficient firepower to take the fort. The troops were then ordered to attack the Castillo de San Marcos with support from Virginia and South Carolina. After Oglethorpe sent William Bull a list of the supplies he needed on 29 December, he launched an invasion on 1 January 1740, again with 200 men. They captured Fort Picolata and Fort San Francisco de Pupo, burning the former and claiming the latter for Georgia. After leaving some troops at de Pupa, Oglethorpe returned to Georgia on 11 January.

After South Carolina was slow in providing aid, Oglethorpe traveled to Charleston, and arrived on 23 March, where he spoke with the Commons House of Assembly. They eventually agreed to provide 300 of Oglethorpe's requested 800 men. The assembly also agreed to send provisions to keep the Native Americans on their side. Twenty South Carolinians arrived by 23 April and another hundred by 9 May. After receiving these men, Oglethorpe attacked Fort St. Diego on 10 May and had captured it by 12 May. On 18 May, the commander of South Carolina's regiment arrived and by the end of the month there were 376 members present. Its size peaked at 512 members, 47 volunteers, and 54 men who were to remain on the schooner Pearl. The colony also sent artillery and ships, leading Oglethorpe to conclude that South Carolina had given "all the assistance they could".

Oglethorpe was also aided by some Native Americans. He struggled with a lack of equipment and skill needed to take a besieged city; there were no engineers, draft horses, or gunners. Upon his request, several other colonies sent supplies, notably Rhode Island and Virginia. The Royal Navy provided a poor blockade of St. Augustine, fully beginning only on 31 May. As early as April, St. Augustine had begun preparing for a siege, and throughout May and June Oglethorpe planned how he would take the city. He initially planned for a siege and an assault, but this quickly proved impractical given his lack of supplies. Next, Oglethorpe instituted a blockade that was designed to starve the inhabitants of the city into surrender; this was accomplished with the Royal Navy and soldiers on the land. Fort San Francisco de Pupo was used to block supplies entering through the St. John's River.

On 15 June, the main contingent of soldiers were resoundingly defeated by an attack by the Spanish and Yamasee Indians. Later that month, a flotilla aimed at reinforcing the city slipped through the blockade. As the navy was going to leave upon the start of the hurricane season on 5 July, Oglethorpe then planned to launch a combined assault, from the land and water. After delays, the plan was abandoned on 2 July when the navy announced an intent to leave on 4 July. He briefly considered holding the siege with 200 seamen and a sloop, but decided the idea was impractical. Finally, Oglethorpe was forced to abandon the siege. He commanded the rear guard during the retreat. The trustees presented a 1741 plan to divide Georgia into two sections, but Oglethorpe refused to work with them.

Spain launched a counter-invasion of Georgia in 1742. Oglethorpe led his force in a defeat of Spain, decisively winning the Battle of Bloody Marsh. On 25 February 1742 he was made a brigadier general. He led another unsuccessful attack on St. Augustine in 1743. That year, William Stephens was named the president of Georgia. The appointment was a product of the trustees' frustration with Oglethorpe's lack of co-operation. He continued to hold practical control over Frederica and let Stephens control Savannah. Stephens' government began to not always defer to Oglethorpe's wishes, as did local officials. In response, Oglethorpe made another bid to hold his power, feeling Georgia functioned best "when there was no other but himself to direct and determine all controversies."

The ODNB considers that Oglethorpe's "military contribution was of the very highest order and significance". While the loss of the Siege of Augustine was attributed by some to Oglethorpe, Baine concludes that "Oglethorpe certainly made mistakes of generalship, but he was not the principal cause of its failure." The war ended in November 1748 and the 42nd Regiment of Foot was removed from Georgia. By 1749, the Trustees had lost most of their interest in Georgia, and they gave up its charter three years later.

Slavery 

In what was known as the Georgia Experiment, Georgia initially banned black slavery in the colony. Oglethorpe opposed slavery because he felt that it prevented Georgia from serving as an effective buffer, because he felt slaves would work with the Spanish to gain their freedom. Further, Georgia was not intended to develop a thriving economy like the Carolina's, and thus didn't need to use slaves. The colony's economy was intended to be based on silk and wine, which made large-scale slavery unnecessary. He also felt that slavery would have a negative effect on "the manners and morality of Georgia's white inhabitants". After the urging of Oglethorpe and other trustees, slavery was banned by the House of Commons in 1735.

Oglethorpe was heavily criticized by many for supporting the ban in the late 1730s, and after his return to England the trustees requested that the ban be ended in 1750. It has been suggested, first by William Stephens in his diary, that Oglethorpe held slaves on his land in South Carolina while slavery was banned in Georgia, but Wilkins writes that the veracity of the claim is "uncertain"—there is no direct evidence supporting it—and he concludes that "the probability appears low that [...] Oglethorpe owned slaves."

Return to England 
Oglethorpe returned to England on 28 September 1743, after the last attack on St. Augustine failed. He continued to be somewhat involved in the colony's affairs, attempting to stop a distinction being established between holding civil and military power, but he never returned to Georgia and generally was uninterested in the activities of the trustees. Oglethorpe was subject to a court-martial, in which it was alleged he misused funds. He was acquitted after two days. 

Oglethorpe married Elizabeth Wright on 15 September 1744.

Oglethorpe fought in the British Army during the Jacobite rising of 1745. By then a major-general, he took command of troops that were mustering in York, England, about 600 men. Scots invading under Charles Edward Stuart penetrated into England. Oglethorpe was tasked with intercepting retreating Scots before they reached Preston, Lancashire, in December 1745. On the 17th, he was initially ordered to engage with the rear of the Scots, led by George Murray, at Shap. The orders were amended to trap the Scots in town early the next morning upon Oglethorpe's intelligence, but the Scots left as the orders were changed. The following day, Oglethorpe travelled to Clifton in Westmorland and took a bridge from the Scots before the Clifton Moor Skirmish that evening. At the skirmish, the British were defeated. Because Oglethorpe had allowed Scots to escape from Shap, he was blamed with the defeat, accused of disobeying orders, and potentially being a Jacobite. The following year, Oglethorpe was court martialled for his actions. After a lengthy defense, he was acquitted by a panel of twelve high-ranking military officials, led by Thomas Wentworth. On 19 September 1747, Oglethorpe was promoted to lieutenant general. However, the Duke of Cumberland, who had been in command at Clifton Moor, 'blacklisted' Oglethorpe from holding command.

He then worked on various reform efforts, with little success, until Oglethorpe and Philip Russell lost their parliamentary seats to James More Molyneux and Philip Carteret Webb in 1754. Oglethorpe's loss has been attributed to his moving to Essex and supporting the Jewish Naturalisation Act, but Baine considers that the election was "rigged against him". Webb and Molyneux gained control of the constituency's steward, bailiff, and constable. They allowed more voters to be admitted than were qualified, in a process known as faggot voting. Around fifty more people voted in the 1754 election than had the previous cycle, in stark contrast to voter numbers that had remained essentially the same since Oglethorpe was elected. While Oglethorpe and Burrell protested to parliament, the election results were upheld.

Retirement and death 

Little is known about Oglethorpe's later life. He served on the committee of the Hospital for the Maintenance and Education of exposed and deserted young Children and was a member of the Committee to encourage British fisheries. After retirement, he became friends with various literary figures in London, including Samuel Johnson, James Boswell, Hannah More and Oliver Goldsmith. Oglethorpe and Boswell became particularly close. Boswell and Johnson offered to write a biography of Oglethorpe, and Boswell began to collect materials, but no such volume was ever published.

From 1755 to 1761 Oglethorpe was out of England. Very little is known about what he did over these six years; they are referred to as his "missing years". On 22 September, he had unsuccessfully petitioned George III to reactivate his Georgia regiment, and by 9 December Oglethorpe had left England and arrived in Rotterdam. There he requested a position in the military of Prussia from his friend James Francis Edward Keith, whom Oglethorpe had fought with in the 1710s. There are no records of what happened to Oglethorpe in the five years after he wrote a letter to Keith on 3 May 1756. Boswell wrote that he "went abroad in 1756 to his freind Keith [...] fought in the army" and "was with Keith when killed". Baine concludes that Oglethorpe took the pseudonym 'John Tebay' and likely joined the Prussian army in mid to late 1756. He was likely with Keith and Frederick the Great during the campaigns of the Seven Years' War. He probably left the army to visit family over part of the winter. In early 1758 Oglethorpe was almost discovered by Joseph Yorke, an Englishman. He was wounded at a battle on 14 October. Keith reportedly fell into Oglethorpe's arms when he was killed at the Battle of Hochkirch. He left the army in March 1759 and had returned to England by October 1761.

In May 1768, during the French conquest of Corsica, Oglethorpe pseudonymously published three essays in support of Corsican independence. He advocated strongly in favor of their independence, along with Boswell.

As colonists in America became increasingly vocal about perceived injustices, Oglethorpe did not publicly speak out, though he privately sympathized with them. From June 1777 to April 1778 Oglethorpe and Granville Sharp unsuccessfully attempted to convince the British leadership to end the war and give the colonists rights as full Englishmen. There was a claim that Oglethorpe was offered refusal to command the British Army in the American Revolutionary War, a claim that Spalding notes scholars have been "unable to discover a shred of truth" to. In June 1785, Oglethorpe met John Adams twice in London.

Oglethorpe died on 1 July 1785, at an estate in Cranham in Essex, to the east of London. He was 88. The cause of death is unknown, though it is thought to have been a disease like influenza that worsened into pneumonia.

Legacy and memorials
In Atlanta, Oglethorpe University and Oglethorpe Park were named after him, while in the state at large, he is the namesake for both Oglethorpe County and the town of Oglethorpe. Also, The James Oglethorpe Primary School in Cranham is named after him.

In 1986 the corps of cadets at the University of North Georgia in Dahlonega, Georgia officially adopted the name of the unit as the "Boar's Head Brigade". The name came from the boar's head on the department crest approved by the U.S. Army adjutant general on 11 August 1937.  The boar's head was a part of the family crest of James Oglethorpe, and is a symbol of fighting spirit and hospitality so deeply a part of Georgia's heritage and the spirit of the corps of cadets at the University of North Georgia.

All Saints' Church in Cranham, where Oglethorpe was buried, was rebuilt . However, the new church stands on the same foundations as the old one, and Oglethorpe's poetic marble memorial is on the south wall of the chancel, as before. In the 1930s, the president of Oglethorpe University Thornwell Jacobs excavated the Oglethorpe family vault in the centre of the chancel at All Saints', although permission to translate the General's relics to a purpose-built shrine at Oglethorpe University (Atlanta) had been refused by the archdeacon.

The James Oglethorpe Monument in Chippewa Square, Savannah, Georgia, created by sculptor Daniel Chester French and architect Henry Bacon, was unveiled in 1910. Oglethorpe faces south, toward Georgia's one-time enemy in Spanish Florida, and his sword is drawn. Another of Savannah's squares, Oglethorpe Square, is named for him.

The city of Fort Oglethorpe in Catoosa and Walker County, Georgia is named for him.

Oglethorpian anniversaries have since led to the donation of the altar rail at All Saints' by a ladies charity in Georgia. In 1996, then Georgia Governor Zell Miller attended Oglethorpe tercentenary festivities in Godalming and at Corpus Christi College, Oxford.

Corpus Christi College holds two portraits of Oglethorpe, a drawing of the general as an old man, which hangs in the Senior Common Room, and a portrait in oils, which hangs in the Breakfast Room.

See also 
Fort Frederica National Monument
Battle of Bloody Marsh
Dungeness
Georgia Experiment
Oglethorpe Plan

Notes

References

Sources

Books

Journals

Further reading 

 
 
 
 
 
 McHarris

External links

 James Oglethorpe Timeline
 The New Georgia Encyclopedia 
 
 James Edward Oglethorpe historical marker
 Landing of Oglethorpe and the Colonists historical marker

1696 births
1785 deaths
Alumni of Corpus Christi College, Oxford
British Army generals
British Army personnel of the Jacobite rising of 1745
British Army personnel of the War of Jenkins' Ear
British MPs 1722–1727
British MPs 1727–1734
British MPs 1734–1741
British MPs 1741–1747
British MPs 1747–1754
Colonial governors of Georgia (U.S. state)
English Anglicans
English Freemasons
English philanthropists
Fellows of the Royal Society
People of Georgia (British colony)
Members of the Parliament of Great Britain for English constituencies
People educated at Eton College
People from Godalming
Pre-statehood history of Georgia (U.S. state)
American social reformers
English abolitionists
Barons in the Jacobite peerage
18th-century philanthropists
Christian abolitionists
Military personnel from Surrey